Václav Pšenička Jr. (14 May 1931 – 31 December 2015) was a Czech weightlifter. He competed at the 1952 Summer Olympics and the 1956 Summer Olympics.

References

1931 births
2015 deaths
Czech male weightlifters
Olympic weightlifters of Czechoslovakia
Weightlifters at the 1952 Summer Olympics
Weightlifters at the 1956 Summer Olympics
Sportspeople from Prague